Hüseyin Saygun (1920 – 31 March 1993) was a Turkish footballer. He competed in the men's tournament at the 1948 Summer Olympics.

Individual
Beşiktaş J.K. Squads of Century (Silver Team)

References

External links
 
 

1920 births
1993 deaths
Turkish footballers
Turkey international footballers
Olympic footballers of Turkey
Footballers at the 1948 Summer Olympics
Footballers from Istanbul
Association football midfielders
Vefa S.K. footballers
Beşiktaş J.K. footballers
Turkish football managers
Beşiktaş J.K. managers